"The Hang of It" is a short story by J. D. Salinger, first published in the July 12, 1941 issue of Collier's magazine. It is a commercial tale of a soldier who just can't seem to get "The Hang of It". It was reprinted in the 1942 and 1943 editions of the Kit Book for Soldiers, Sailors, and Marines by Consolidated Book Publishers, Inc.

References 

1941 short stories
Short stories by J. D. Salinger
Works originally published in Collier's